is a city located in eastern Shizuoka Prefecture, Japan. , the city had an estimated population of 189,486 in 91,986 households, and a population density of 1,014 persons per km2.

Geography 
Numazu is at the northwestern end of the Izu Peninsula, which is a leisure destination known for its numerous hot springs. Mount Fuji, Japan's tallest mountain, may also be seen from Numazu on clear days. Warmed by the Kuroshio Current, the area enjoys a warm maritime climate with hot, humid summers and mild, cool winters. The Kano River runs through the middle of the city. Mount Ashitaka (1188 meters) is the highest point in the city

Neighboring municipalities
Shizuoka Prefecture
Mishima
Fuji
Izu
Izunokuni
Shimizu
Nagaizumi
Kannami

Demographics
Per Japanese census data, the population of Numazu has been in slow decline over the past 30 years.

Climate
The city has a climate characterized by hot and humid summers, and relatively mild winters (Köppen climate classification Cfa).  The average annual temperature in Numazu is 15.9 °C. The average annual rainfall is 1938 mm with September as the wettest month. The temperatures are highest on average in August, at around 26.8 °C, and lowest in January, at around 5.9 °C.

History 
Numazu is an ancient settlement, mentioned in Nara period records as the original provincial capital of Suruga Province before the separation of Izu Province from Suruga in 680 AD, and subsequent transfer of the provincial capital to the banks of the Abe River in what is now Shizuoka city. During the early part of the Tokugawa shogunate, Numazu was ruled as part of Odawara Domain, but with the construction of Numazu Castle in 1777, it became the separate Numazu Domain. Numazu prospered in the Edo period from its location on the Tōkaidō highway connecting Edo with Kyoto, with Numazu-juku and Hara-juku as two of the 53 post stations.

After the Meiji Restoration, Numazu Station was opened on the Tōkaidō Main Line on February 1, 1889. With the establishment of the modern municipalities system of the early Meiji period in 1889, the area was reorganized into Numazu Town within Suntō District, Shizuoka From its seaside location, Numazu gained a reputation as a health resort, which was further enhanced by its selection as the location of an imperial villa built for Emperor Meiji in 1893. The area become popular with other members of the nobility, statesmen (including Inoue Kaoru) and writers. Numazu town expanded in 1923 by merger with Yanagihara village, becoming Numazu City on July 1, 1923.

Central Numazu was destroyed by a fire in 1926. In 1944, the city further expanded through merger with neighboring Katahama, Kanaoka, Ooka and Shizuura villages. The city was a target for American air raids in World War II, and was largely destroyed by bombing on July 17, 1945.

In 1955, the villages of Ashitaka, Oohira, Uchiura, and Nishiura merged with Numazu, and in 1968 Hara Town also merged with Numazu. In April 2005, the village of Heda (from Tagata District) was merged into Numazu. In 2007, Numazu hosted the 29th WorldSkills International Championship.

Government
Numazu has a mayor-council form of government with a directly elected mayor and a unicameral city legislature of 28 members.

Economy 
Numazu is an industrial city and regional financial center, and its port is a major center of Shizuoka prefecture's commercial fishing industry. Numazu produces more dried Japanese horse mackerel than any other region in Japan. The city accounts for about half of Japan's total production. Agriculture is dominated by production of mandarin oranges and green tea, with Brussels sprouts, dairy products and rice as secondary products. Numazu is the location of the head office of Suruga Bank, Shizuoka Chuo Bank and Numazu Shinkin Bank.

Education
Numazu has 24 public elementary schools, 17 public middle schools one public combined middle/high school operated by the city government. The city has four public high schools operated by the Shizuoka Prefectural Board of Education. There are also one private elementary school, one private combined middle/high school and five private high schools. The prefecture also operates three special education schools in Numazu for the handicapped.

Transportation

Railway
 Central Japan Railway Company - Tōkaidō Main Line
  -  - 
 Central Japan Railway Company - Gotemba Line
  -

Highway
  Tomei Expressway
 Shin-Tōmei Expressway
 Izu-Jūkan Expressway

Local attractions 

Numazu is a gateway to Mount Fuji, Hakone, and Izu Peninsula, which are major tourist attractions. The harbour area has seafood restaurants and features an anti-tsunami barrier with an observation floor on top that offers a panoramic view of the city and the surrounding area. There is a shopping street close to the main train station.

Numazu has the longest coastline of any municipality in the prefecture. The Senbonhama ("Thousand Tree Beach") seaside is considered one of the best places to view Osezaki, Nihondaira, or the southern Japan Alps against the background of Sembonmatsubara and Mount Fuji. Three aquariums are located in Numazu: Mito Sea Paradise, Awashima Marine Park and Numazu Deepblue Aquarium.

National Historic Sites
Nagahama Castle ruins
Kōkokuji Castle ruins
Yasumiba ruins

Sister city relations 
  – Kalamazoo, Michigan, United States (since 1963)
  – Yueyang, Hunan, China (since 1985)
  – Ueda, Nagano, Japan

Notable people from Numazu 

 Tomita Tsunejirō (1865–1937) – the earliest disciple of judo
 Yasushi Inoue – novelist
 Nobutaka Machimura – politician
 Shinji Ono – professional soccer player
 Masakuni Yamamoto  – professional soccer player
 Kento Sugiyama – professional baseball player
 Kyoko Iwasaki – Olympic medalist swimmer
 Koji Murofushi – Olympic medalist in hammer-throw
 Miu Hirano – Table Tennis player
 Yamada Nagamasa – Sengoku period merchant-adventurer
 Norio Ohga – former CEO of Sony
 Tomoyoshi Murayama – artist and playwright
 Masato Harada – movie director
 Ulka Sasaki — mixed martial artist
 Chika Takami — School Idol
 You Watanabe — School Idol
 Riko Sakurauchi — School Idol
 Hanamaru Kunikida — School Idol
 Ruby Kurosawa — School Idol
 Yoshiko Tsushima — School Idol
 Dia Kurosawa — School Idol
 Kanan Matsuura — School Idol
 Mari Ohara — School Idol

Popular culture
Numazu is the main setting of the anime Love Live! Sunshine!!, and several characters live in Uchiura and Awashima Island. As such, many tourists come to Numazu because of the anime, and various things in the city, such as taxicabs, buses, ferries, and manhole covers, have special Love Live-themed designs.

References

External links 

  
  
 Travel guide to Numazu for tourists and foreign residents

Cities in Shizuoka Prefecture
Populated coastal places in Japan
Port settlements in Japan
Numazu, Shizuoka